Dehnavi (Persian: دهنوی) is an Iranian surname. Notable people with the surname include:

Ghasem Dehnavi (born 1981), Iranian football player 
Nasrollah Dehnavi (born 1950), Iranian weightlifter
Sajad Dehnavi (born 1989), Iranian volleyball player

Persian-language surnames